Brunette Ambition is an autobiographical book by American actress and singer Lea Michele, released on May 20, 2014 by Random House imprint Crown Archetype. It placed at number three on The New York Times Best Seller list shortly after its release. The book also debuted on the U.S. Nonfiction Best Seller list at number nine.

Brunette Ambition covers topics such as family and friendships, working in show business, fashion, food, and personal health.

Background
On May 23, 2013, it was reported that Michele had landed a book deal with Random House and Harmony Books to write an autobiography, chronicling her rise from Broadway actress to the star of the Fox comedy-drama series Glee. In the announcement, Michele said, "There was not a guidebook when I was growing up, that detailed everything I would need to do, and know, to get where I am today. But I believe I can write one of the sorts: not a how-to-make-it-in-show-business book, but a guide to harnessing tenacity, passion, enthusiasm and hard work to make your dreams come true."

Related books
In June 2014, shortly after the release of Brunette Ambition, it was reported that Michele would write a follow-up. The second book, titled You First: Journal Your Way to Your Best Life was published on September 22, 2015 by Crown Archetype.

References

External links
 

2014 non-fiction books
American autobiographies
Crown Publishing Group books